Thomas "Tom" Minns (born 4 September 1994) is an English professional rugby league footballer who plays as a  for Wakefield Trinity in the Betfred Super League. 

He has previously played for the Leeds Rhinos, and on loan from Leeds at the London Broncos and Featherstone Rovers, and Hull Kingston Rovers in two separate spells in the Super League and the Championship.

Background
Minns was born in Leeds, West Yorkshire, England.

Playing career

Leeds Rhinos
In 2013, Minns made three appearances for Leeds and scored a single try.

London Broncos
In 2014, he was loaned to the London Broncos, with two of his fellow, young team-mates from Leeds.

Featherstone Rovers
Minns spent the 2015 season on loan at the Featherstone Rovers, recording 16 outings and scoring eight tries.

Hull Kingston Rovers
On 3 July 2015, it was announced that Minns had signed a three-year deal to play for Hull Kingston Rovers in the Super League, starting from the 2016 rugby league season. Minns suffered relegation from the Super League with Hull Kingston Rovers in the 2016 season, due to losing the Million Pound Game at the hands of Salford. 12-months later however, Minns was part of the Hull Kingston Rovers side that won promotion back to the Super League, at the first time of asking following relegation the season prior. On 22 May 2019, it was announced that Minns would be returning to play for Hull Kingston Rovers until the end of the 2019 season.

Newcastle Thunder
On 25 October 2021 it was reported that he had signed for Newcastle Thunder in the RFL Championship

Wakefield Trinity
On 5 January 2022, it was reported that he had signed for Wakefield Trinity in the Super League.

References

External links
Hull KR profile
SL profile

1994 births
Living people
English rugby league players
Featherstone Rovers players
Hull Kingston Rovers players
Leeds Rhinos players
London Broncos players
Newcastle Thunder players
Rugby league centres
Rugby league players from Leeds
Rugby league wingers
Wakefield Trinity players